is a Japanese TV actress, former J-pop singer, and the oldest member of the groups Lip's and Nanatsuboshi. She was born in Shimizu-ku, Shizuoka, and debuted on 21 March 1990.

Filmography

Film
 My Secret Cache (1997)
 Hana Yori Dango Final (2008)
 Boku no Obāchan (2008)
 Rakugo Eiga (2013)
 Nukero Moebius! (2023)

Television 
Tonbi (2013, TBS)

References

External links 
 
 Katou Takako Official Website 
 Takako Katou Official Blog 
 Katou Takako at J-Dorama.de

1970 births
Living people
People from Shizuoka (city)
Japanese film actresses
Japanese television actresses
Japanese women pop singers
Japanese idols
Japanese television personalities
Musicians from Shizuoka Prefecture
Amuse Inc. talents
20th-century Japanese actresses
20th-century Japanese women singers
20th-century Japanese singers
21st-century Japanese actresses
21st-century Japanese women singers
21st-century Japanese singers